"We're a Winner" is a 1967 single recorded by The Impressions for the ABC-Paramount label. Written and produced by Impressions lead singer Curtis Mayfield, the song is notable as one of the most prominent popular recordings dealing with the subject of black pride. The phrase "We're a Winner" was later used as the motto of Mayfield's record label Curtom Records.

Personnel
Lead vocals and guitar by Curtis Mayfield
Background vocals by Sam Gooden and Fred Cash
Guitar by Phil Upchurch
Bass guitar by Lenny Brown
Drums by Billy Griffin
Produced, arranged, and conducted by Johnny Pate

Chart performance
The single peaked at number 14 on the Billboard Pop Chart, and was the number-one single on the Billboard R&B Chart during the week of March 1, 1968.

See also
 Civil rights movement in popular culture

References

External links
Hogan, Ed. "[ We're a Winner]". ''Allmusic.com

1967 singles
ABC Records singles
Protest songs
The Impressions songs
Songs written by Curtis Mayfield
1967 songs
Civil rights movement in popular culture